The Battle of Gemas—part of the wider Battle of Muar—took place during the Japanese invasion of Malaya in the Pacific Campaign of the Second World War. The action occurred on 14 January 1942 at the Gemencheh Bridge near Gemas and saw around 1,000 troops of the Japanese 5th Division killed or wounded during a fierce ambush initiated by Australian soldiers from 2/30th Battalion, assigned to the 27th Brigade of the 8th Division.

Battle
The ambush site was located at a point where a wooden bridge crossed the Sungei Gemencheh river, connecting Gemas with the larger neighbouring town of Tampin, and bringing traffic on the road into a long cutting through thick bushland. The 2/30th Battalion subsequently deployed one company in the ambush position  forward of the main body of the battalion.

The Japanese had passed through Tampin and needed to cross the bridge to reach Gemas and at 16:00 on 14 January 1942, "B" Company 2/30th Battalion under Captain Desmond Duffy, initiated the ambush. As the Japanese passed through the engagement area in their hundreds—many of them on bicycles—the bridge was blown and the Australians opened fire with machine guns, rifles and grenades. Faulty telephone lines back to the main battalion position prevented Duffy from being able to call in artillery fire on to the follow on Japanese forces, however, and the forward company was subsequently forced to withdraw after a 20-minute engagement as the Japanese began to press their positions.

Aftermath

The battle following the ambush, and a further action closer to Gemas during which the Australian anti-tank gunners from the 2/4th Anti-Tank Regiment destroyed six out of eight Japanese tanks, lasted another two days. The fighting ended with the Australians withdrawing through Gemas to the Fort Rose Estate. According to Coulthard-Clark, total Japanese casualties in the wider battle numbered over 1,000, while the Australians lost 81 killed, wounded or missing; Allen Warren provides figures of 70 killed and 57 wounded in the initial engagement.

Despite the tactical victory at Gemas, as well as strong stands later at Bakri, the 22nd Australian Brigade’s ambush north of Jemaluang and the fighting withdrawal from Muar, the Japanese advance down the Malay Peninsula was only temporarily slowed.

Documentary
The Battle of Gemas has remained a footnote in the broader Battle of Muar until a documentary by the same name expanded the importance of this battle.

Notes

References

  
 

Gemas
1942 in British Malaya
Gemas
Gemas
Australia–Japan military relations
January 1942 events